The Ligier JS3 is a sports-racing car that was built by Automobiles Ligier. It was unveiled in 1971 and ended its competition life in the same year. Only one JS3, chassis JS3-01, was ever built.

The Car
The design for the car was done late in 1970 by Michel Têtu. Two different models of the car were built and tested at the Eiffel wind tunnel late in January 1971 before choosing one to become the final design. In contrast to the dual-purpose JS1 fixed-head coupé, the JS3 was an open-top two-door two-seat "barquette" meant exclusively for circuit racing. Like the JS1, the JS3 was named to honour company owner Guy Ligier's former teammate, business partner and close friend Jo Schlesser who died in his 3rd Formula 1 race.

The chassis was a combination of the techniques Têtu used for the JS1 and contemporary Formula 1 practice, resulting in a monocoque of Klegecell-PVC/aluminum-sheet panels and TMAW-welded aluminum.

Ligier chose Cosworth to supply the engine. The JS3 did not use the four-cylinder FVA found in the JS1 but instead got a 2993cc DFV V8 capable of producing more than 400 bhp. This engine had already had considerable success in Formula 1, but far less success in sportscar racing. Keith Duckworth himself felt that the DFV's flat-plane crankshaft would limit the engine's reliability and, thus, potential success, in endurance racing events. The DFV-powered Ford P68 and Ford P69 designed by Len Bailey, for example, were unsuccessful 

The Cosworth DFV engine was mated to a 5-speed Hewland transaxle. The particular transaxle used has been reported to have been either an FG400 Formula 1 model or a DG300 sports-racer model.

The engine was mounted as a stressed-member in the chassis, although during restoration it was noted that the way the loads were fed into the tub was not optimal.

Ligier's purpose for building this car was to win the 24 Heures du Mans.

The JS3 was officially unveiled on March 15, 1971, at Automobiles Ligier's Vichy workshops. It wore the distinctive green-and-yellow livery of the car's sponsor, British Petroleum.

Racing history

At the 24 Heures du Mans the car was driven by Guy Ligier and Patrick Depailler. For the first time the bodywork incorporates headlamps for night driving. Qualifying times are not as impressive as they were during the test days, with the JS3 coming in 17th at the end of qualifying with a time of 3:39.800. 18 hours into the race itself the team is running in fifth place when the car develops gearbox problems. Ligier decides to attempt a repair, and the Gulf 917 team of John Wyer offers a spare transaxle. Adapting a transmission meant to bolt up to a Porsche engine to the JS3's Cosworth takes the mechanics four hours of time in the pits. The car eventually rejoins the race but it is far behind the leaders. It will cross the finish line having completed only 270 laps, 127 fewer than the winners and too few for the car to be classified. It will be the only car in its class to finish, and will be the first DFV-powered two-seater to race and finish at Le Mans.

While the car typically ran with long-tail bodywork appropriate to high-speed courses it did run a short-tail body at the Criterium du Nivernais.

The car languished at Ligier's Vichy works until it was acquired by Jacques Laffitte in lieu of payment. From him it was acquired by Peter Morley cars and then passed to Nicholas Zapata, who had it restored and raced by Willie Green debut at Coys and win at the annual six-hour classic race at Spa in 2001 and at the 24 Heures du Mans Legend race in 2003. Then sold to Pierre Bardignon's Mas du Clos and then to Jean Guittard, who races under the pseudonym of "Mr. John of B". Complete restoration to original specifications in 1999 by Simon Hadfield with Geoff Wyatt. Was to be sold at Christies in Paris in 2016. Subsequent owners included Mike Jankowski and Jacques Nicolet.

Historic racing appearances
The JS3 has appeared at the following historic racing events:
 2016 Imola Classic
 2016 Jarama Classic
 2015 Dix Mille Tours
 2015 Monza Historic
 2015 Grand Prix de l'Age d'Or
 2014 Dix Mille Tours
 2014 Le Mans Classic
 2014 Grand Prix de l'Age d'Or
 2011 Dix Mille Tours
 2011 Spa Classic
 2010 Le Mans Series Silverstone 1000 km (ILMC)
 2010 Le Mans Classic
 2006 Le Mans Series Donnington 1000 km
 2006 Le Mans Classic
 2004 Le Mans Endurance Series Spa 1000 km
 2004 Le Mans Classic

Win at 51st GP de l'Age d'Or in 2015 driven by "Mr John of B" (the racing pseudonym of Jean Guittard) and David Ferrer.

Legacy
The JS3 remained the only open-top barquette endurance racer built by Ligier before purchasing the assets of Equipe Matra and entering Formula 1.

An agreement between Guy Ligier and Jacques Nicolet's Onroak Automotive saw the JS3 name revived for a new series of Prototype racers to be campaigned at Le Mans by Nicolet's own OAK racing.

References

See also

Cars introduced in 1971
Ligier racing cars